Lianshan Zhuang and Yao Autonomous County (postal: Lienshan; ; Cantonese jyutping: lin4 saan1) is located in northern Guangdong province, China, and is under the administration of Qingyuan prefecture-level city. It borders Hunan to the north and Guangxi to the west and has a large concentration of Zhuang and Yao peoples, for whom the autonomous country was created and named.

History
The State Council, established Lianshan Zhuang and Yao Autonomous County on September 26, 1962.

It is one of Guangdong's three autonomous counties, with its county seat in the town of Jitian, and the county governs 12 towns 3 agriculture tree farms.

The population is 114,000 people, with minorities accounting for above 65%, with the remainder being mostly Han.

Climate

Languages 
Lianshan has three ethnic groups: Zhuang, Han, Yao. The Zhuang people accounted for 47.73%, Han people accounted for 36.12%, Yao people accounted for 15.89%.

The Zhuang language of Lianshan is located in the southern part of the county, like Yongfeng, Futang, Xiaosanjiang, Jiatian, Shangshuai, It's the dialect of Northern Tai language. The local dialect can be communicated with the other Zhuang language as Yishan, Liujiang, Nanxiang, Xiashuai.

The local Chinese language is called Lianshanese, it's the dialect of Yue language, locate in the northern part of the county, like Jitian, Yonghe, Taibao, Hedong, and it's the lingua franca of all county. And the locals also could speak the Cantonese (standard Yue language) with some accent.

The local Yao language has two dialect: one is Mien language, the mother tongue of Guoshan Yao(), they are living in Sanshui; another is Jianmien language, the speaker is called Bapai Yao(), they are living in Daxuxinzhai. Between the two languages, the grammar is same, but have some difference on the vocabulary and pronunciation.

Sub-divide 
.Lianshan is divided into 7 towns and 2 forest farm:
Towns: Yonghe, Jitian, Taibao, Hedong, Futang, Xiaosanjiang, Shangshuai
Forest farm: Lianshan, Hedong

References 

 
County-level divisions of Guangdong
Zhuang autonomous areas
Yao autonomous counties
Qingyuan